Acetonitrile, often abbreviated MeCN (methyl cyanide), is the chemical compound with the formula  and structure . This colourless liquid is the simplest organic nitrile (hydrogen cyanide is a simpler nitrile, but the cyanide anion is not classed as organic). It is produced mainly as a byproduct of acrylonitrile manufacture. It is used as a polar aprotic solvent in organic synthesis and in the purification of butadiene. The  skeleton is linear with a short  distance of 1.16 Å.

Acetonitrile was first prepared in 1847 by the French chemist Jean-Baptiste Dumas.

Applications
Acetonitrile is used mainly as a solvent in the purification of butadiene in refineries. Specifically, acetonitrile is fed into the top of a distillation column filled with hydrocarbons including butadiene, and as the acetonitrile falls down through the column, it absorbs the butadiene which is then sent from the bottom of the tower to a second separating tower. Heat is then employed in the separating tower to separate the butadiene.

In the laboratory, it is used as a medium-polarity solvent that is miscible with water and a range of organic solvents, but not saturated hydrocarbons.  It has a convenient liquid range and a high dielectric constant of 38.8. With a dipole moment of 3.92 D, acetonitrile dissolves a wide range of ionic and nonpolar compounds and is useful as a mobile phase in HPLC and LC–MS.

It is widely used in battery applications because of its relatively high dielectric constant and ability to dissolve electrolytes.  For similar reasons it is a popular solvent in cyclic voltammetry.

Its ultraviolet transparency UV cutoff, low viscosity and low chemical reactivity make it a popular choice for high-performance liquid chromatography (HPLC).

Acetonitrile plays a significant role as the dominant solvent used in oligonucleotide synthesis from nucleoside phosphoramidites.

Industrially, it is used as a solvent for the manufacture of pharmaceuticals and photographic film.

Organic synthesis
Acetonitrile is a common two-carbon building block in organic synthesis of many useful chemicals, including acetamidine hydrochloride, thiamine, and α-napthaleneacetic acid. Its reaction with cyanogen chloride affords malononitrile.

As an electron pair donor
Acetonitrile has a free electron pair at the nitrogen atom, which can form many transition metal nitrile complexes. Being weakly basic, it is an easily displaceable ligand. For example, bis(acetonitrile)palladium dichloride is prepared by heating a suspension of palladium chloride in acetonitrile:
PdCl2 + 2 CH3CN -> PdCl2(CH3CN)2
A related complex is tetrakis(acetonitrile)copper(I) hexafluorophosphate . The  groups in these complexes are rapidly displaced by many other ligands.

It also forms Lewis adducts with group 13 Lewis acids like boron trifluoride. In superacids, it is possible to protonate acetonitrile.

Production
Acetonitrile is a byproduct from the manufacture of acrylonitrile. Most is combusted to support the intended process but an estimated several thousand tons are retained for the above-mentioned applications. Production trends for acetonitrile thus generally follow those of acrylonitrile. Acetonitrile can also be produced by many other methods, but these are of no commercial importance as of 2002. Illustrative routes are by dehydration of acetamide or by hydrogenation of mixtures of carbon monoxide and ammonia. In ,  of acetonitrile were produced in the US.

Catalytic ammoxidation of ethylene was also researched.

Acetonitrile shortage in 2008–2009 
Starting in October 2008, the worldwide supply of acetonitrile was low because Chinese production was shut down for the Olympics.  Furthermore, a U.S. factory was damaged in Texas during Hurricane Ike.  Due to the  global economic slowdown, the production of acrylonitrile used in acrylic fibers and acrylonitrile butadiene styrene (ABS) resins decreased.  Acetonitrile is a byproduct in the production of acrylonitrile and its production also decreased, further compounding the acetonitrile shortage. The global shortage of acetonitrile continued through early 2009.

Safety

Toxicity
Acetonitrile has only modest toxicity in small doses. It can be metabolised to produce hydrogen cyanide, which is the source of the observed toxic effects. Generally the onset of toxic effects is delayed, due to the time required for the body to metabolize acetonitrile to cyanide (generally about 2–12 hours).

Cases of acetonitrile poisoning in humans (or, to be more specific, of cyanide poisoning after exposure to acetonitrile) are rare but not unknown, by inhalation, ingestion and (possibly) by skin absorption. The symptoms, which do not usually appear for several hours after the exposure, include breathing difficulties, slow pulse rate, nausea, and vomiting. Convulsions and coma can occur in serious cases, followed by death from respiratory failure. The treatment is as for cyanide poisoning, with oxygen, sodium nitrite, and sodium thiosulfate among the most commonly used emergency treatments.

It has been used in formulations for nail polish remover, despite its toxicity. At least two cases have been reported of accidental poisoning of young children by acetonitrile-based nail polish remover, one of which was fatal. Acetone and ethyl acetate are often preferred as safer for domestic use, and acetonitrile has been banned in cosmetic products in the European Economic Area since March 2000.

Metabolism and excretion

In common with other nitriles, acetonitrile can be metabolised in microsomes, especially in the liver, to produce hydrogen cyanide, as was first shown by Pozzani et al. in 1959. The first step in this pathway is the oxidation of acetonitrile to glycolonitrile by an NADPH-dependent cytochrome P450 monooxygenase. The glycolonitrile then undergoes a spontaneous decomposition to give hydrogen cyanide and formaldehyde. Formaldehyde, a toxin and a carcinogen on its own, is further oxidized to formic acid, which is another source of toxicity.

The metabolism of acetonitrile is much slower than that of other nitriles, which accounts for its relatively low toxicity. Hence, one hour after administration of a potentially lethal dose, the concentration of cyanide in the rat brain was  that for a propionitrile dose 60 times lower (see table).

The relatively slow metabolism of acetonitrile to hydrogen cyanide allows more of the cyanide produced to be detoxified within the body to thiocyanate (the rhodanese pathway). It also allows more of the acetonitrile to be excreted unchanged before it is metabolised. The main pathways of excretion are by exhalation and in the urine.

See also
Trichloroacetonitrile – a derivative of acetonitrile used to protect alcohol groups, and also used as a reagent in the Overman rearrangement

References

External links
 WebBook page for C2H3N
 International Chemical Safety Card 0088
 National Pollutant Inventory - Acetonitrile fact sheet
 NIOSH Pocket Guide to Chemical Hazards
 Chemical Summary for Acetonitrile (CAS No. 75-05-8), Office of Pollution Prevention and Toxics, U.S. Environmental Protection Agency
 Simulation of acetonitrile
 How Did Organic Matter Reach Earth? Cosmic Detectives Trace Origin of Complex Organic Molecules, on: SciTechDaily. September 10, 2020. Source: Tokyo University of Science: Acetonitrile found in molecular cloud Sgr B2(M) at the center of our galaxy.

Hazardous air pollutants
2
Solvents
Ligands
Organic compounds with 2 carbon atoms